Diamond Ridge (Dena'ina: Ch’aqiniggech’) is a census-designated place (CDP) just outside Homer in Kenai Peninsula Borough, Alaska, United States. At the 2010 census the population was 1,156, down from 1,802 in 2000.

Geography
Diamond Ridge is located at  (59.665391, -151.570826) and is bordered to the south by the city of Homer and to the southeast by the city of Kachemak. To the east is the Fritz Creek CDP, while to the north and west is the Anchor Point CDP. The farthest west part of the Diamond Ridge CDP borders Cook Inlet at the mouth of Kachemak Bay.

The community is named for the high ground, Diamond Ridge, on which it sits. Parallel landforms to the north are Crossman Ridge in the center of the CDP and a ridge connecting  Ohlson Mountain and  Lookout Mountain in the north. The terrain slopes north from the ridges to the Anchor River, which forms the northern boundary of the CDP.

The main access is via Diamond Ridge Road, which runs across the top of the  ridge and connects to feeder roads on either side.

Demographics

Diamond Ridge first appeared on the 2000 U.S. Census as a census-designated place (CDP).

As of the census of 2000, there were 1,802 people, 683 households, and 471 families residing in the CDP. There were 850 housing units at an average density of 17.8/sq mi (6.9/km2). The racial makeup of the CDP was 92.29% White, 0.11% Black or African American, 3.16% Native American, 0.44% Asian, 0.89% from other races, and 3.11% from two or more races. 2.11% of the population were Hispanic or Latino of any race.

There were 683 households, out of which 38.9% had children under the age of 18 living with them, 60.0% were married couples living together, 5.7% had a female householder with no husband present, and 31.0% were non-families. 24.0% of all households were made up of individuals, and 3.2% had someone living alone who was 65 years of age or older. The average household size was 2.60 and the average family size was 3.15.

In the CDP, the population was spread out, with 29.7% under the age of 18, 5.3% from 18 to 24, 30.5% from 25 to 44, 28.6% from 45 to 64, and 5.9% who were 65 years of age or older. The median age was 38 years. For every 100 females, there were 101.6 males. For every 100 females age 18 and over, there were 104.9 males.

The median income for a household in the CDP was $50,977, and the median income for a family was $61,813. Males had a median income of $51,964 versus $26,548 for females. The per capita income for the CDP was $23,864. About 7.9% of families and 7.9% of the population were below the poverty line, including 9.2% of those under age 18 and 4.8% of those age 65 or over.

Parks and trails

Diamond Ridge is home to two park areas with trail systems. One is the Homer Demonstration Forest, a preserve on the slopes just below the actual ridge itself. It contains an arboretum, self-guided nature trails, and is one end of the Homestead Trail which crosses the demonstration forest, climbs up Diamond Ridge and across a deep valley to Crossman Ridge, eventually ending at the Homer Reservoir. In winter months there are extensive groomed trails for cross-country skiing, as well as a snowshoe trail.

The other park in the area is the Diamond Creek State Recreation Area. This is a newer unit of Alaska State Parks and has little development. The road leads to several parking areas for access to hiking and biking trails. The bike trails are constructed and maintained by a local cycling club.

References

Census-designated places in Alaska
Census-designated places in Kenai Peninsula Borough, Alaska
Populated coastal places in Alaska on the Pacific Ocean